The 38th Regiment Illinois Volunteer Infantry was an infantry regiment that served in the Union Army during the American Civil War.

Service
The 38th Illinois Infantry was organized at Camp Butler, Illinois and mustered into Federal service on August 15, 1861, for three years service.

The regiment was mustered out on December 31, 1865.

Total strength and casualties
The regiment suffered 7 officers and 107 enlisted men who were killed in action or who died of their wounds and 3 officers and 177 enlisted men who died of disease, for a total of 294 fatalities.

Commanders
Colonel William P. Carlin - promoted brigadier general on November 29, 1862.
Colonel Daniel H. Gilmer - killed in action at the Battle of Chickamauga on September 23, 1863
Colonel William F. Chapman - died Pulaski, Tennessee, on November 23, 1864.
1st Lt. Frederick Mortimer Crandal U.S.A. 38th Inf. 28 Jul 1866, Brvt. Capt. for Arkansas Post Ark 2 mar 1867, Brvt. Major. for Arkansas Post Ark 2 mar 1867, Brvt Lt. Col. For Fort Blakely Ala. 2 Mar 1867 <ref Civil War High Commands https://books.google.com/books?isbn=0804780358 Page 189>

See also
List of Illinois Civil War Units
Illinois in the American Civil War

Notes

References
The Civil War Archive

Units and formations of the Union Army from Illinois
1861 establishments in Illinois
Military units and formations established in 1861
Military units and formations disestablished in 1865